Jon Tenuta (born February 25, 1957) is an American football coach who is the defensive coordinator and linebackers coach for the New Orleans Breakers of the United States Football League (USFL). Previously, Tenuta was the defensive coordinator for the Virginia Cavaliers.

Education
He attended Upper Arlington High School in Columbus, Ohio. In his senior season, Upper Arlington played in the state championship game and lost to Warren Harding.  He finished his college playing career at University of Virginia. High School nickname was "Punchy," after the Hawaiian Punch character.

Coaching career
Tenuta was the former associate head coach and defensive coordinator of the Georgia Tech Yellow Jackets. In the wake of the November 26, 2007 firing of Georgia Tech head coach Chan Gailey, Tenuta was named Interim Head Coach, but was not retained by incoming head coach Paul Johnson. He also coached the Yellow Jackets' defensive backs and was one of the highest paid coordinators in college football.

On January 31, 2008, Tenuta was named assistant head coach/defense at the University of Notre Dame succeeding Bill Lewis. Tenuta coached the linebackers and ran the defense for three seasons with the Irish. He was hired by Charlie Weis after having worked at Georgia Tech since 2002. Tenuta's position at Notre Dame ended following the firing of Weis after the 2009 season ended. Incoming Head Coach Brian Kelly chose not to retain Tenuta and replaced him with his then– Cincinnati defensive coordinator Bob Diaco.

On January 3, 2012, it was announced that Tenuta was hired as assistant coach at the University of Illinois at Urbana–Champaign by new head coach Tim Beckman, however Tenuta announced on January 4, 2012, that he would remain at NC State.

On January 3, 2013, it was announced that Tenuta and former North Carolina State head coach Tom O'Brien would be joining the coaching staff at the University of Virginia. Tenuta served as the defensive coordinator for the Cavaliers until 2015.

January 11, 2017, he was named safeties coach for University of Cincinnati, under head coach Luke Fickell.

Head coaching record

Notes

References

External links
 Virginia Tech profile
 Cincinnati profile

1957 births
Living people
American football defensive backs
Cincinnati Bearcats football coaches
Georgia Tech Yellow Jackets football coaches
Kansas State Wildcats football coaches
Marshall Thundering Herd football coaches
NC State Wolfpack football coaches
New Orleans Breakers (2022) coaches
North Carolina Tar Heels football coaches
Notre Dame Fighting Irish football coaches
SMU Mustangs football coaches
Virginia Cavaliers football coaches
Virginia Cavaliers football players
Virginia Tech Hokies football players
Sportspeople from Columbus, Ohio
Coaches of American football from Ohio
Players of American football from Columbus, Ohio